Fun and Games  (released in the US as 1000 Convicts and a Woman) is a 1971 British sexploitation film directed by Ray Austin. It stars Alexandra Hay as an oversexed teenage girl who causes havoc among the inmates of a British prison which is governed by her father. The cast also includes Sandor Elès, Harry Baird and Neil Hallett.

Cast
Alexandra Hay - Angela Thorne 
Sandor Elès - Paul Floret 
Harry Baird - Carl 
Neil Hallett - Warden Thorne 
Robert Brown - Ralph 
Fredric Abbott - Forbus 
David Bauer - Gribney 
Peter J. Elliott - Matthews 
Tracy Reed - Linda 
Stella Tanner - Mrs. Jackson

External links

1971 films
British sexploitation films
1971 drama films
British drama films
1970s English-language films
Films directed by Ray Austin
1970s British films